HMS Malabar was a 74-gun third-rate ship of the line of the Royal Navy, launched on 28 December 1818 at Bombay Dockyard.

Sir W. Montagu was appointed captain on 25 July 1834, fitting for the Mediterranean, where, and off Lisbon, he continued until ordered home at the close of 1837 for the purpose of being paid off.

On 19 October 1838, Malabar ran aground off Prince Edward Island in British North America and was damaged. Two of her crew were lost. She was refloated on 20 October 1838 and towed into Three Rivers in Lower Canada.

On 26–27 August 1843, Malabar, under the command of Sir George Sartorius, assisted in fighting a fire that destroyed the United States Navy sidewheel frigate  at Gibraltar and took aboard about 200 of Missouri′s survivors.

Malabar was hulked in October 1848, eventually becoming a coal hulk, and was renamed Myrtle in October 1883. The hulk was sold out of the navy in July 1905.

Notes

References

Lavery, Brian (2003) The Ship of the Line - Volume 1: The development of the battlefleet 1650-1850. Conway Maritime Press. .

Ships of the line of the Royal Navy
Repulse-class ships of the line
British ships built in India
Coal hulks
1818 ships
Maritime incidents in October 1838